Partulina talpina is a species of tropical air-breathing land snail, a terrestrial pulmonate gastropod mollusk in the family Achatinellidae. This species is endemic to Hawaii in the United States.

References

Partulina
Molluscs of Hawaii
Taxonomy articles created by Polbot